The Geelong College is an Australian independent and co-educational, Christian day and boarding school located in Newtown, an inner-western suburb of Geelong, Victoria.

Established in 1861 by Alexander James Campbell, a Presbyterian minister, the Geelong College was formerly a school of the Presbyterian Church of Australia and is now operates in association with the Uniting Church in Australia but is not governed or managed by the church. The school has a non-selective enrolment policy and currently caters for over 1,200 students from kindergarten to Year 12, including around 100 boarding students from Years 7 to 12. The boarding students are accommodated in two boarding houses at the senior school campus, one for each sex. Boys reside in Mackie House while girls reside in Mossgiel House.

The college is affiliated with the Headmasters' and Headmistresses' Conference, the Association of Heads of Independent Schools of Australia (AHISA), the Junior School Heads Association of Australia (JSHAA), the Association of Independent Schools of Victoria (AISV), the Australian Boarding Schools Association (ABSA), and has been a member of the Associated Public Schools of Victoria (APS) since 1908.

History 

Following the closure of the first Geelong Grammar, Campbell established a committee to found a new Presbyterian school. On 8 July 1861, Geelong College was officially established. The school year later started with an enrolment of 62. George Morrison was appointed the first principal and three years later became the owner of the school. The school moved to its present location in 1871. The architects Alexander Davidson and George Henderson designed its main building.

In 1908, the college returned to the ownership of the Presbyterian Church of Australia and became a member of the Associated Public Schools of Victoria (APS). Land was acquired for a new in 1946 but the new preparatory campus did not open until 1960. This particular campus became co-educational in 1974, with co-education being extended to the senior campus in 1975.  The college undertook an extensive redevelopment and refurbishment of the middle school, which is on the preparatory campus, in 2012.

Principals

Campuses 

 Senior School – Years 9 to 12
Talbot Street, Newtown
 Middle School – Years 4 to 8
Aberdeen Street, Newtown
 Junior School – kindergarten to Year 3
Minerva Road, Newtown
 Mokborree (Otway Campus) – all years
(under development)

House system
A house system operates at both the senior and middle schools. Each house is named after a significant person in the college's history. Sporting and music competitions are held between them each year.

At the middle school, there are four houses: Pegasus (white), Bellerophon (blue), Minerva (red) and Helicon (green), which meet for sporting events throughout each year. The house model is not used for pastoral care at this campus. The names of these houses originate from Roman mythology.

Curriculum 
Geelong College offers its senior students the Victorian Certificate of Education (VCE).

Sport

Secondary students of the college participate in the summer, winter and spring seasons of the Associated Public Schools of Victoria (APS)/Associated Grammar Schools of Victoria (AGSV) sport competition. Choices offered for summer sports include badminton, cricket (boys only), softball (girls only), tennis and rowing. Winter sports include Australian rules football (boys only), netball (girls only), soccer and basketball. Students may also participate in a number of local competitions and the college is particularly known for its excellence and achievement in rowing competitions.

APS and AGSV/APS premierships 
Geelong College has won the following APS and AGSV/APS premierships:

Boys:

 Cricket (7) – 1946, 1947, 1963, 1979, 1982, 1995, 2011
 Football (6) – 1925, 1927, 1932, 1963, 1964, 2006
 Rowing (13) – 1936, 1944, 1955, 1956, 1957, 1959, 1960, 1976, 1990, 1993, 2000, 2001, 2003

Girls:

 Athletics (5) – 1995, 1998, 1999, 2002, 2005
 Hockey (2) – 1995, 1996
 Netball (4) – 1993, 1994, 1996, 1998
 Rowing (10) – 1981, 1982, 1983, 1989, 1992, 1999, 2002, 2003, 2006, 2011
 Tennis (6) – 1995, 1996, 1999, 2002, 2004, 2005

Geelong College Challenge
The Geelong College Challenge is a competition run by the college at the preparatory school campus in which government schools in the region can enter. The challenge started in 1993. Participating schools send in an entry based on the set theme, and the teams with the 16 best entries are accepted. These schools then form a team of four Year 6 students (two boys and two girls). On the weekend of the challenge, the teams participate in various challenges, which include art, music, drama, technology, information technology, physical education and mathematics challenges.

Notable alumni

Alumni of the school are known as Old Geelong Collegians and may elect to join the alumni association, the Old Geelong Collegians' Association (OGCA). Some notable Old Geelong Collegians include:

Academic
 Sir Robert Honeycombe – scientist and metallurgist, Emeritus Professor of Metallurgy at Cambridge University, UK.
John Marden – first headmaster of the Presbyterian Ladies' College, Sydney (1888–1919) and Pymble Ladies' College (1916–1919); pioneer of women's education; Presbyterian elder

Business
Bill Dix – former Managing Director of Ford Australia and Chairman of Qantas
Don Kendell – founder of Kendell Airlines

Entertainment, media and the arts
Russell Boyd – cinematographer: Picnic at Hanging Rock, Gallipoli, Crocodile Dundee.
John Duigan – film director and writer
Gideon Haigh – journalist and author
Robert Ingpen – artist, writer and illustrator
Rebecca Maddern – journalist
Veronica Milsom – comedian and triple j radio presenter
George Ernest Morrison – Australian adventurer; correspondent for The Times Peking (Beijing)
Guy Pearce – actor
Sean Sowerby – journalist
Nathan Templeton – journalist

Medicine and science
Sir Frank Macfarlane Burnet – biologist and winner of the Nobel Prize for Medicine

Noel Sherson FRCS, FRACS (1936 – 2007) – surgeon and senior lecturer in Anatomy at the University of Melbourne

Politics, public service and the law
Barry James Maddern AC (1937 – January 1994), Australian barrister and jurist
Lionel Aingimea – President of Nauru since 2019
John Button – senior Federal Minister in the Hawke and Keating Governments
Sir Arthur Coles – retail founder, MP, Lord Mayor of Melbourne; first Chairman of Australian National Airlines (TAA)
Robert Doyle – Lord Mayor of Melbourne, politician; Member for Malvern in the Legislative Assembly (1992–2006); Leader of the Victorian Opposition (2002–2006)
 Major General Sir James Harrison, KCMG, CB, CBE – former Governor of South Australia
 Sarah Henderson, MP – Member for Corangamite (Liberal Party) from 2013-2019, Senator for Victoria since 2019
 Fergus Stewart McArthur, MP – Member for Corangamite (Liberal Party) from 1984-2007
 Sir Gordon Stewart McArthur – Liberal Party politician, President of the Victorian Legislative Council (1958–1965), grazier and barrister
James Nimmo  – public servant

Religion
 Thomas Henry Armstrong – first Bishop of Wangaratta

Sport
 Jaxson Barham  – former AFL footballer for the Collingwood Magpies
 Tim Callan – former AFL footballer for the Western Bulldogs
 David A. Clarke – former AFL footballer for the Geelong and Carlton Football Clubs.
 David E. Clarke – former AFL footballer for the Geelong and Carlton Football Clubs.
 Georgie Clarke – Olympian (athletics)
 Tim Clarke – former AFL footballer for the Hawthorn Hawks
Richard Colman, Paralympic athletics gold medallist
 Ayce Cordy – former AFL footballer for the Western Bulldogs
 Zaine Cordy – current AFL footballer for the Western Bulldogs, premiership player in the 2016 AFL Grand Final
 Ed Curnow – current AFL footballer for Carlton FC
 Charlie Curnow – current AFL footballer for Carlton FC
 Josh Dunkley-Smith – 2012 Olympic rowing silver medallist
 Edward 'Carji' Greeves – winner of the inaugural Brownlow Medal for the best and fairest player in the Victorian Football League (1924)
 Lindsay Hassett – captain of the Australian Test cricket team from 1949 to 1953
 John "Jack" Bailey Hawkes – Australian tennis champion 
 Lachlan Henderson – current AFL footballer for Geelong Football Club
 Steve Horvat – former Australian international soccer player
 Jack Iverson – Australian Test cricketer 
 Bowen Lockwood – former AFL footballer for 
 Edward Russell Mockridge – Olympic cyclist
 David Ramage, two-time Olympian rower 
 Ian Redpath – Australian Test cricketer
 Josh Saunders – former AFL footballer for St Kilda
 Will Schofield – former AFL footballer for the West Coast Eagles
 Paul Sheahan – Australian Test cricketer; former headmaster of The Geelong College and Melbourne Grammar School
 Alec Boswell Timms – VFA footballer for Geelong and Scottish international rugby union player from 1896 to 1905
 Alex Witherden – AFL footballer
 Ned McHenry – AFL footballer
 Mason Wood – AFL footballer
 Charlie Lazzaro – AFL footballer

See also 
 List of schools in Victoria
List of boarding schools

References

Further reading
 Notman, G.C. & Keith, B.R. 1961. The Geelong College 1861–1961. The Geelong College Council, Geelong.
 Deakin University. 1979. Portrait of The Geelong College: Continuity and Change in an Independent School. Deakin University, Waurn Ponds, Vic. .
 Penrose, Helen. 2011. The Way to the Stars: 150 Years of The Geelong College. Australian Scholarly Publishing, North Melbourne. .

External links 
 
 Heritage Guide to The Geelong College

Associated Public Schools of Victoria
Boarding schools in Victoria (Australia)
Educational institutions established in 1861
Presbyterian schools in Australia
Schools in Geelong
Uniting Church schools in Australia
Member schools of the Headmasters' and Headmistresses' Conference
Junior School Heads Association of Australia Member Schools
1861 establishments in Australia
Geelong College